Mahonia decipiens is a species of shrub in the Berberidaceae described as a species in 1913. It is endemic to Hubei Province in China.

The species is listed as vulnerable.

References

decipiens
Flora of Hubei
Endemic flora of China
Vulnerable plants
Plants described in 1913
Taxonomy articles created by Polbot